The 2018 Comoros Premier League is the top level football competition in the Comoros.

Regional leagues

Mwali

Ndzuwani

Ngazidja

Note: Etoile du Sud (Foumbouni) had three points deducted.

National championship
The champions of the three regional leagues of each island will take part in the final tournament to determinate the overall champions.

Final table.

Championship playoff
[Oct 17, Stade de Domoni (Ndzuani)]

Fomboni                   awd Volcan Club               [awarded 0-3, Fomboni dns]

See also
2018 Comoros Cup

References

Football leagues in the Comoros
Premier League
Comoros